Horace Anthony Baker (1 September 1910 – 1 March 1974) was an English footballer who played at outside-right for Port Vale, Tranmere Rovers, Shrewsbury Town and Southport. He younger brother, Frank, was also a professional footballer.

Early and personal life
Horace Anthony Baker was the son of a former Fenton Town player and four of his brothers also played football, including the youngest Frank, who went on to play for Stoke City. Baker worked as a bus conductor prior to World War II and was working as a spot-welder when he died of a heart attack during his sleep on 1 March 1974.

Career
Baker played for Longton Hall, before joining Port Vale as an amateur in March 1932, signing professional forms two months later. He made seven Second Division appearances in the 1932–33 season, scoring one goal in a 4–0 win over Notts County at the Old Recreation Ground on 20 March. He featured just three times in the 1933–34 season, and was given a free transfer to Tranmere Rovers in May 1934. Tranmere finished sixth and third in the Third Division North in 1934–35 and 1935–36; Baker played 23 league games at Prenton Park, scoring ten goals. He later played for Shrewsbury Town, scoring 30 goals in the Birmingham League from outside-right. He went on to sign with Southport, where he scored on his league debut against Accrington Stanley. He lost his first-team place to Albert Stapleton after a 5–0 defeat at Crewe Alexandra. He later returned to Shrewsbury Town.

Career statistics
Source:

References

People from Fenton, Staffordshire
Footballers from Stoke-on-Trent
English footballers
Association football wingers
Port Vale F.C. players
Tranmere Rovers F.C. players
Shrewsbury Town F.C. players
Southport F.C. players
English Football League players
1910 births
1974 deaths